Ouratea is a genus of flowering plants in the family (Ochnaceae).

Species include:

 Ouratea amplectens
 Ouratea boliviana Van Tieghem
 Ouratea brevicalyx
 Ouratea cocleensis
 Ouratea confertiflora (Pohl) Engl.
 Ouratea elegans
 Ouratea gigantophylla (Erhard) Engl.
 Ouratea insulae
 Ouratea jamaicensis
 Ouratea megaphylla Sastre
 Ouratea patelliformis
 Ouratea quintasii
 Ouratea schusteri
 Ouratea superba Engl.
 Ouratea tumacoensis
 Ouratea wallnoeferiana Sastre

References

 
Malpighiales genera
Taxonomy articles created by Polbot